Going the Distance can refer to the following:

 Going the distance (boxing), a boxing expression for fighting a full bout without being knocked out
 Going the Distance (1979 film), a 1979 Canadian documentary film about the 1978 Commonwealth Games
 Going the Distance (2004 film), a 2004 Canadian comedy film
 Going the Distance (2010 film), a 2010 American comedy film
 "The Distance" (Cake song), a single by the band Cake
 "Go the Distance", a song from the 1997 Disney film, Hercules

See also
 The Distance (disambiguation)